LG K62 is a mid-range Android smartphone manufactured by LG Electronics, announced and released in September 2020 and released worldwide in November 2020, along with LG K22, LG K42 and LG K52 released in September 2020, as the 4th phone for the 6th generation of the LG K series phones lineup. The phone is similar to its predecessor, LG K61. But it has 28 MP front camera, flaunts a smooth, silky matte glass finish that's fingerprint resistant, fingerprint sensor on the side, LG 3D Sound Engine, wide-screen display with 20:9 ratio and the camera arranged on a square along with the dual-LED flash sensor, similar to the Samsung Galaxy A12's camera array.

Specifications

Design 

The LG K62 measures itself 165 x 76.7 x 8.4 mm (6.50 x 3.02 x 0.33 in) and weigh 186 g (6.56 oz). It is available only either with White, Sky Blue or Red.

Display 

The LG K62 has a wide 6.6-inch Infinity-O IPS LCD display, with 720 x 1600 pixels resolution and 20:9 aspect ratio, ~83.1% screen-to-body ratio, ~266 ppi density.

Hardware 

The LG K62 is powered by the chipset Mediatek MT6765 Helio P35 (12 nm), an Octa-core (4x2.3 GHz Cortex-A53 & 4x1.8 GHz Cortex-A53) CPU and a PowerVR GE8320 GPU. It runs on Android 10, with LG UX 9.1.

Camera 

The LG K62 has a 4 AI cameras array arranged on a square, similar to that design of Samsung Galaxy A12's camera array, along with a dual-LED flash sensor.
 48 megapixels, f/1.8 (standard), 1/2.0", 0.8 µm with PDAF
 5 megapixels, f/2.2, 115˚ (ultra wide, x0.5), 1/5.0", 1.12 µm
 2 megapixels, f/2.4, (macro)
 2 megapixels, f/2.4, (depth)

The LG K62 also has a 28 megapixels punch-hole camera on the front.

References 

LG Electronics smartphones
Mobile phones introduced in 2020
Android (operating system) devices
Mobile phones with multiple rear cameras